Bridgeport is an unincorporated community in Cocke County, Tennessee, United States. It is located east of Newport, the county seat.

Notes

Unincorporated communities in Cocke County, Tennessee
Unincorporated communities in Tennessee